Vaughan Media, LLC is a company which owns the broadcast licenses of several stations operated by Nexstar Media Group.

History
The company was founded in 2011 when it made its first acquisition, WBDT, from ACME Communications. LIN Media, the owner of WDTN, could not legally own both WDTN and WBDT. It sold off certain assets, including WBDT's broadcast license, to Vaughan Media. The sale was consummated on May 20, 2011, at which point LIN took control of the station via a shared services agreement with WDTN.

In 2012, the company acquired television stations owned by PBC Broadcasting which were operated by New Vision Television. 

In August 2014, it was announced that Sinclair Broadcast Group would take over the shared services agreement to operate WTGS as well as rights to acquire the station. Sinclair exercised the option and acquired the station upon close of the sale of LIN Media to Media General. 

The remaining Vaughan stations continued under operation by Media General after the LIN sale. On January 17, 2017, Nexstar Media Group closed its acquisition of Media General and took over operation of the Vaughan stations.

Stations

Current

Former Vaughan stations

References

Nexstar Media Group
Mass media companies established in 2011
Television broadcasting companies of the United States